Tony O'Connor may refer to:

 Tony O'Connor (teacher) (1921 or 1922)
 Tony O'Connor (rugby union) (1934–2015), Welsh rugby union player
 Tony O'Connor (composer) (1961–2010), Australian composer, producer and performer
 Tony O'Connor (footballer) (born 1966), Irish football player
 Tony O'Connor (rower), Irish rower
 Tony O'Connor (judge), Irish judge